Boubakar "Kiki" Kouyaté (born 15 April 1997) is a Malian professional footballer who plays as a centre-back for  club Montpellier and the Mali national team.

Club career

Early career
Kouyaté began his career in 2013 with "Esperance Football Club de Médine" in Bamako at third and second level in Malian football. He signed with Moroccan club Kawkab Marrakech, playing in the Botola. Having finished third in the previous season, Kawkab qualified for the 2016 CAF Confederation Cup, and the club reached the group stage. Kawkab missed out on qualifying for the knockout stage, and they finished in 14th in the Botola. Kouyaté left the club at the conclusion of the group stage.

Sporting CP
On 26 August 2016, Kouyaté signed with Portuguese giants Sporting CP, and was assigned to their B-team. He made his professional debut in LigaPro on 11 September in a game against Varzim. Kouyaté made 32 starts in his first season, playing alongside Ivanildo Fernandes at centre-back, as the club finished in 14th.

Kouyaté was included in a senior match-day squad for the first time on 12 October 2017 in a Taça de Portugal match against ARC Oleiros. He made 12 appearances with the reserves in 2017–18 LigaPro, but sustained an injury on 4 February 2018 against Cova da Piedade, missing the rest of the season. Sporting B finished the season in 18th and were relegated. The reserve club was dissolved following the season, preferring to participate in Portugal's new under-23 competition than play in the third-tier. Kouyaté was playing with the under-23 team in the Liga Revelaçao at the time of his transfer, having made 18 appearances.

Troyes
In January 2019, Kouyaté signed a 3.5-year contract with Troyes in France's second division, Ligue 2, brought in by the club's Portuguese manager, Rui Almeida. His debut came on 1 February playing the final minutes of a 1–1 draw with Metz. His full debut came two weeks later, away to Niort, replacing Jérémy Cordoval at right-back. Kouyaté would start the next five games, the last two on the right of a back three, but was taken off at half-time against Sochaux on 15 March. He wouldn't make another start until a 2–4 win on 10 May against Clermont, a game in which he scored his first goal for the club. Tenth at the time of his acquisition, Troyes were in contention for automatic promotion until the penultimate match-day. Troyes lost in the promotion play-off semi-final to Lens, and Kouyaté finished his first season making 12 appearances. After the season, Almeida left for Caen.

Kouyaté scored on his full season debut, the first goal in a 2–1 defeat to Lens in the Coupe de la Ligue on 9 August, and also scored in the club's next two matches in Ligue 2. Kouyaté made most of his appearances on the right of manager Laurent Batlles's preferred back three, starting 14 of the club's matches in the league in the first half of the season, chipping in with five goals, good enough to make him the club's top goal-scorer. He started Troyes's first two matches out of the break, but picked up an injury against Le Havre on 27 January. Kouyaté would make just one more appearance that season, coming off the bench for added time against Paris FC on 6 March, before the season was cancelled due to the COVID-19 pandemic in France. Kouyaté finished as the club's top goal-scorer, and Troyes finished the season in fourth, two points away from promotion to Ligue 1 after the promotion play-offs were scrapped. For his performances during the season, Kouyaté earned a spot on the bench in L'Équipe's team of the season in Ligue 2. Following the season, Kouyaté was reported to have attracted the interest of English club Nottingham Forest.

Metz
On 25 August 2020, Kouyaté signed a contract with Metz until 2024.

Montpellier 
On 20 January 2023, Kouyaté joined Ligue 1 side Montpellier. The transfer fee of the deal was reported to be €6 million.

International career
Kouyaté was part of the Malian squad that reached the 2015 FIFA U-20 World Cup semi-final.

Kouyaté received his first senior call-up in September 2017 for World Cup qualification matches against Morocco. He made his debut for Mali on 26 March 2019 in a friendly against Senegal. Kouyaté was included in the Mali squad for the 2019 Africa Cup of Nations. Mali won their group, but lost in the round of 16 to the Ivory Coast, and Kouyaté started their final group stage game against Angola.

Career statistics

Club

International

References

1997 births
Living people
Sportspeople from Bamako
Association football central defenders
Malian footballers
Mali under-20 international footballers
Mali international footballers
2019 Africa Cup of Nations players
2021 Africa Cup of Nations players
Liga Portugal 2 players
Ligue 1 players
Ligue 2 players
Sporting CP B players
ES Troyes AC players
FC Metz players
Montpellier HSC players
21st-century Malian people
Malian expatriate footballers
Malian expatriate sportspeople in Morocco
Expatriate footballers in Morocco
Malian expatriate sportspeople in Portugal
Expatriate footballers in Portugal
Malian expatriate sportspeople in France
Expatriate footballers in France